Edith Ella Baldwin (November 19, 1870, Worcester, Massachusetts – February 21, 1941) was an American painter of portraits and miniatures, a craftswoman, and writer. She studied in Paris at Académie Julian, under William-Adolphe Bouguereau and Tony Robert-Fleury; at the Angelo Colarossi studios under Gustave-Claude-Etienne Courtois, also under Julius Rolshoven and Henry Mosler. 

At the Salon of the Champ de Mars, she exhibited a portrait in pastel, in 1901; at exhibitions of the Society of American Artists in 1898 and 1899, she exhibited miniatures; also pictures in oils at Worcester, 1903. A collection of her writings are held by Duke University. These include unpublished stories, novels, poetry, and lecture notes, as well as diary excerpts. Her writings covered the timeless themes of love and religion, but also contemporary issues including automobiles, labor strikes, and women's rights.

References

1848 births
1920 deaths
Painters from Massachusetts
American portrait painters
American women painters
Writers from Worcester, Massachusetts
Académie Julian alumni
Académie Colarossi alumni
19th-century American painters
19th-century American writers
19th-century American women writers
20th-century American painters
20th-century American writers
20th-century American women writers
20th-century American women artists
19th-century American women artists
American expatriates in France